Sir Robert Eyles Egerton  (15 April 1827 – 30 September 1912) was a British administrator in the Imperial Civil Service who served as a member of the Imperial Legislative Council and as Lieutenant Governor of the Punjab.

Biography
He was born into the Egerton family, the youngest son of William Egerton. He was educated at Exeter College, Oxford, and the East India Company College.

He began his career in India in 1849. During the Indian Mutiny of 1857 he served as Deputy Commissioner at Lahore.  In 1869 he was appointed Commissioner of Nagpur, and in 1871 was made Financial Commissioner of the Punjab. Between 1871 and 1874 he also served as a member of the Governor General's Imperial Legislative Council. In 1879 he was appointed  Lieutenant Governor of the Punjab. Egerton retired from service at the end of his term in 1882.

Lord Lytton described Egerton as an administrator with 'loyalty and good sense' and 'a tower of strength to the Administration'.

Personal life
On 18 April 1853 he married Mary Warren, with whom he had seven children. His daughter, Frances Mary Egerton, married Sir William Mackworth Young.

References

1827 births
1912 deaths
Indian Civil Service (British India) officers
Robert Eyles
British people in colonial India
Knights Commander of the Order of the Star of India
Companions of the Order of the Indian Empire
Alumni of Exeter College, Oxford